Peachey is a surname. Notable people with the surname include:

Alf Peachey, English footballer
Allan Peachey (1949–2011), New Zealand politician
David Peachey (born 1974), Australian rugby league player
Don Peachey (born 1933), American musician
Emily Peachey, American actress
James Peachey, 1st Baron Selsey (1723–1808), British politician and courtier
John Peachey (disambiguation), several people
Melissa Peachey (born 1980), English television personality
Stuart Peachey, English historian
Tyrone Peachey (born 1991), Australian rugby league player

See also
Peachy (disambiguation)